Dune Drifter is a low-budget science fiction film, released in 2020, written and directed by Marc Price (who was the writer and director of an earlier film in 2008, Colin (film)).  Dune Drifter starred Phoebe Sparrow, 
Daisy Aitkens, and Simon Dwyer Thomas.  Director of Photography was Noel Darcy, Production Designer was Nicky Evans, Producer was Michelle Parkyn, and Music was by Adam Langston.

Plot
The human race, now based at Terra Prime, are at war with an alien race called the Drekks, who have already devastated cities on Earth, such as New York City, Istanbul, and Quebec City.  Adler (Phoebe Sparrow) is Grey 6 gunner, flying in hyperspace with pilot Yaren (Daisy Aitkens), as part of Dune Squadron, Reserve Gemini Unit, a squadron of seven Terra Prime space fighters.  They receive a video briefing from Colonel Danforth (Alastair Kirton) of the starship Valiant, directing them to rendezvous with them at the planet Erebus, where he assumes that Terra Prime forces will have repelled Drekk ships.  But upon leaving hyperspace, Dune Squadron see the Valiant under heavy attack by Drekk ships.  Colonel Danforth directs the squadron to attack six Drekk ships, warning them that the Drekk shields have been configured to resist plasma blasts.  Grey leader, Callaghan (Charlotte Mounter), leads an attack on the six Drekk ships, where their plasma blasts have little or no effect on the Drekk shields.  With difficulty, the squadron manages to destroy one Drekk ship, but this leads to most of the squadron being destroyed by the Drekks, except for Adler's ship, which is damaged by an exploding ship, and crash lands on the planet Erebus.  
On Erebus, with a corrosive, unbreathable atmosphere, Adler, wearing her flight suit and helmet, moves the injured Yaren to an emergency inflatable life raft with an atmosphere inside.  Back at the ship, Adler needs the start-up code to activate communications, but Yaren gives her a code which does not work: 16305.  Adler manages to use 1234 as the start-up code.  But they are out of communications range from Terra Prime ships.  At night, Adler hears another ship crash-land on Erebus, and on her ship's radio, discovers that it is a Drekk ship.  Yaren dies in the morning.  On the second night, a creature attacks the life raft, deflating it, so Adler escapes into the ship where she manages to shoot the creature dead with plasma blasts.  Adler picks up communications from the Valiant which orders the Terra Prime ships to retreat, leaving Adler alone on Erebus.  The next morning, Adler walks to where the Drekk ship crash landed, as her ship needs a replacement plasma injector coil.  This leads to a confrontation with a Drekk warrior, who is able to resist being shot at by her plasma pistol, and ends with Adler killing the Drekk with a knife.  Adler finds the Drekk ship, and attacks the two Drekks guarding it, with her plasma pistol and a fuel grenade.  Adler manages to grab a Drekk rifle, which she uses to shoot dead one Drekk, and almost destroy the Drekk ship.  From the ship, she extracts the plasma injector coil that she needs for her ship.  Meanwhile, the last Drekk warrior, obtains a rifle and shoots at a departing Adler, damaging the rifle she had.  At a geyser field, Adler is attacked by the Drekk who has caught up with her, and she falls into a cave where her helmet is damaged.  The Drekk picks up the plasma injector coil with the aim of taking Adler's ship.  
Adler crawls back to her ship ahead of the Drekk, where she replaces her damaged helmet with Yaren's helmet.  When the Drekk arrives at her ship, Adler attacks the Drekk with plasma blasts from the ship, as well as with a rock in her hand, and she eventually kills the Drekk with their rifle.  With the Drekk rifle stowed aboard, Adler installs the plasma injector coil into her ship and flies it out of Erebus.  She remembers to use the code that Yaren had given to her, 16305, which happens to be the navigation pre-set code to set course for the ship to fly via hyperspace back to Terra Prime.

Cast

Phoebe Sparrow – Adler (Grey 6 gunner)

Daisy Aitkens – Yaren (Grey 6 pilot)

Simon Dwyer Thomas – Drekk warrior

Alastair Kirton – Colonel Danforth

Charlotte Mounter – Callaghan (Grey leader)

Production

The space fighter and battle scenes were filmed in London, during COVID-19 restrictions, where actors performed in a mock-up of the space fighter cockpit, in a flat.
The outdoor Erebus scenes were filmed in Iceland.

Release

Home Media

Dune Drifter was released on DVD, on 1 December 2020, with a running time of 95 minutes, and included the Producer's Cut of the film. The film was also streamed during the virtual Arrow Video Frightfest film event in October 2020, and featured during the Leeds International Film Festival in 2021.

Critical Response
Rotten Tomatoes scored Dune Drifter 100%, with positive reviews.  
The film also attracted a positive review from Jennie Kermode on Eye for Film, who said "Dune Drifter is an object lesson for all low budget filmmakers.  The plot may be simple, the effects work in the opening section may look a bit rough, but the acting is superb and director Marc Price creates a powerful atmosphere. The result punches well above its weight." Eric Mortensen on Geeky Hobbies welcomed Dune Drifter in 2020, saying that "Dune Drifter has a decent amount of action sequences, but they are spaced out. The movie has a much greater emphasis on the main character just surviving. This means that character development plays a big role in the movie. I think this is one of the film’s greatest strengths. While most of the movie features only one character, I thought the character development was good. The plot is compelling and is well written in my opinion. The movie does a good job telling an interesting story about trying to survive on an alien planet."
Following Frightfest in 2020, Dune Drifter was reviewed by Kim Newman, who said Marc Price had delivered an ambitious science fiction film, featuring a simple, gritty story with few frills, and a nice sense of widescreen spectacle. 
For Exit 6 Film Festival, Marc Price was interviewed in 2021, about his work, and Dune Drifter was praised for boasting some great miniature and in-camera visual effects for a film with a modest budget.  
Film Authority said that "although filmed in a UK living room the results look dynamic enough to keep the attention, and make Dune Drifter a cut above the average." 
In 2022, two years after the film was released, Dune Drifter was reviewed by Jim McLennan on Girls with Guns, who commented on “an admirable effort in terms of its budget”, and he also said that Phoebe Sparrow “portrays the heroine with a no-nonsense approach, prepared to do whatever is necessary to survive”.

References

British science fiction films
2020 films
Films shot in London